The great gerbil (Rhombomys opimus) is a large rodent found throughout much of Central Asia.

Description
Their skulls are distinctive by having two grooves in each incisor. They have large front claws used for burrowing.

Distribution and habitat
Great gerbils are found in arid habitats, predominantly in sandy or clay deserts. They are found in Turkmenistan, Kazakhstan, Mongolia, China, Pakistan, Afghanistan, and Iran.

Predators
The great gerbil is preyed on by foxes, owls, kites, wildcats, vultures, and cobras.

Ecology and behavior
Great gerbils live in family groups and occupy one burrow per family. Their burrows can be fairly extensive with separate chambers for nests and food storage. Great gerbils spend considerably more time in the burrows during winter, but do not hibernate. They are predominantly diurnal. Food consists mostly of vegetable matter.

The animals are often colonial. Longevity is 2–4 years. Burrow system complexes have a distinctive region of cleared soil and can be seen and mapped from aerial photos and satellite images. Inhabited great gerbil burrows can be distinguished from abandoned burrows using satellite images.

Great gerbils are known reservoirs of Yersinia pestis, the bacterium that causes plague, and of Leishmania major, the causative agent of zoonotic cutaneous leishmaniasis. They are also known as crop pests and have been implicated in exacerbating erosion.

References

External links

Gerbils
Mammals of Asia
Mammals of Pakistan
Mammals of Afghanistan
Mammals of Central Asia
Mammals of Mongolia
Gerbil, Great
Mammals described in 1823